Matlapeng Ray Molomo (9 January 1930 - 25 December 2019) was a politician in Botswana. Molomo was Speaker of the National Assembly of Botswana 1999–2004, and was a member of the Pan-African Parliament. Molomo attended the University of Ottawa. He has been a cabinet minister, Member of Parliament, permanent secretary, under secretary, educational planner, college principal, researcher, university lecturer, author and president of the Botswana Football Association. The story of his upbringing is no different from that of a typical Motswana boy of yester-year, who grew up among older boys at the cattle post looking after his father's cattle.

Matlapeng Ray Molomo is also a Tswana books author. He authored books such as Sebaga sa lorato, a play that was used by Botswana examination for a while. He wrote a book titled Democratic Deficit in Parliament of Botswana in 2012 about misgivings pertaining to the manner in which the Executive appears to be conflicted with both the Judiciary and Parliament. This book also offers a historical overview into the inception and manifestation of the Parliament of Botswana.

He was the president of Botswana National Front, but switched later to Botswana Democratic Party.

References

External links
 "Visit by the Speaker of the National Assembly of the Republic of Botswana"
 "Botswana Parliament Leader to Visit China"
 Members of the Pan-African Parliament

1930 births
2019 deaths
Speakers of the National Assembly (Botswana)
University of Ottawa alumni
Members of the Pan-African Parliament from Botswana
Botswana Democratic Party politicians
Botswana National Front politicians